The men's 3000 metres steeplechase event at the 2015 European Athletics U23 Championships was held in Tallinn, Estonia, at Kadriorg Stadium on 12 July.

Medalists

Results

Final
12 July

Participation
According to an unofficial count, 14 athletes from 9 countries participated in the event.

References

3000 metres steeplechasechase
Steeplechase at the European Athletics U23 Championships